Carl Johansson may refer to:
Carl Johansson (footballer, born 1994), Swedish footballer
Carl Johansson (footballer, born 1998), Swedish footballer
Carl Edvard Johansson (1864–1943), Swedish inventor and scientist
Carl August Johansson (1863-1944) Swedish landscape painter
Carl Hugo Johansson (1887–1977), Swedish sport shooter